is a Japanese singer, presenter, variety tarento and actor. He is the keyboardist of the Japanese male idol group Kanjani Eight.

Early life
When he was in junior high school his classmate was a fan of V6. He was recommended to "receive an audition," but at that time was caught up in club activities and school events. He was invited again after retiring from club activities. In 1996 he was invited to send a resume. At this point, his mother opposed it, but she said "please keep the promise". He went to the audition and passed. You Yokoyama also participated in the audition at that time, and Hideaki Takizawa was a judge.

Career 
He appeared with You Yokoyama and Subaru Shibutani on Christmas Live of KinKi Kids immediately after the audition. After that, they became the initial members of the Kansai Junior.

"Chattery Fight Thursday Kanjani You Yokoyama-Shingo Murakami's laughing big investigation line" started in 1999 on  Shinnosuke Furumoto: Chaparasuka Woo! (Nippon Cultural Broadcasting).

They formed Kanjani Eight in 2002 and debuted with the CD Naniwa iroha Bushi in 2004.

He performed a solo concert in Osaka Shochikuza in December 2006.

From January to February 2008, he performed in a two-person stage Mitei "Ichi" with Shibutani. The performance was a Shibutani-Murakami self-produced performance, and the two undertook the three roles of making, directing and casting.

From January to February 2009, he performed in the stage show If or ... It has been performed every year since then.

In 2010, he was adopted as a Proactiv advertising character.

In 2014, he served as TBS casters of the "2014 FIFA World Cup" with Koji Kato.

Filmography

TV programs

Entertainment shows
1996: Tsuyoshi Domoto no Do-Ya
1997: Kanjani Knight
1998: Nanjani!? Kanjani
1999: Pikaichi
2001: Japan Walker
2001: Uso!? Japan
2003: Momoko no Oh! Sore! Miyo!
2007: Megami no Antenna
2008: Ariehen Sekai
2011: Hirunandesu! 
2012: Okasama 100!!: Geinōjin Tsuma mo Sansen! Gōka Mrs-tachi ni Manabu Shiawaseno Hint
2012: Monday Lateshow
2012: Quiz: Tokihakanenari
2012: Kanjani Eight no Ashita wa dotchida!
2013: Ōen Document: Ashita wa dotchida
2013: Murakami Mayonaise no Tsukko Masete Itadakimasu!
2015: Shingo Murakami to Sports no Kamisama-tachi

Special programs
1999: Haru made Matenai! Kanjani Isshōkenmei Special Otona e no Kaidan
2008: Shinsuke Shimada no Omoide Auction
2011: Masaki Aiba no Bartender Dai Sakusen
2011: Nihonjin ga Shiritai Sūji no Nazo! Himitsu no Sūji-kun!!
2011: Kaiun Shōnen! Miracle J
2011: Quiz! Shinmei Kaikoku Gojiten
2013: My Fair Boy: Gokujō Danshi no tsukuri kata
2015: NTV+Lourve Bijutsukan Tokubetsu Bangumi Sekai Kyokugen Artist Best20
2016: Sekai! Kyokugen Artist Best20
FNS 27-Jikan TV 2017

Music programs
2013: Gekokujō Karaoke Survival

Sports programs
2014: Me de Supo: Ōen shitaku naru Athlete
2014: FIFA World Cup: Brazil Games

Dramas
1999: Mamachari Deka
1999: Nekketsu Renai Dō
1999: Nana-ri no Samurai: J-ka no Hanran
1999: Kowai Nichiyōbi
2000: Ike Ike Ikemen!
2000: Kowai Nichiyōbi −2000-
2001: Shijō Saiaku no Date
2001: Neverland
2003: Engisha.
2004: Hagure Keiji Junjoha
2008: Arigatō, Okan
2009: My Girl
2010: 0-Gōshitsu no Kyaku
2011: Inu o Kau to Iu Koto
2011: 24 Hour Television Special Drama Iki teru dake de nan kuru nai sa
2012: Papadol!
2013: Fuji TV Opening 55th Anniversary Special Drama The Genie Family

Movies
2012: Eight Ranger
2014: Eight Ranger 2

Voice acting
2011: Crayon Shin-chan: The Storm Called: Operation Golden Spy
2017: Monster Hunter Stories: Ride On

Radio
2002: Super Star QR
2003: Kanjani Eight: You Yokoyama to Shingo Murakami no Reccomen!
ABC Music Paradise: Kanjani no Otokomae o Mezase!
2004: Shingo Murakami no Shūkan Kanjani Tsūshin
2013: Kanjani Eight: Shingo Murakami to Ryuhei Marukawa no Reccomen!
2016: Kanjani Eight Shingo Murakami to Johnny's West Akito Kiriyama to Junta Nakama no Reccomen!

Advertisements
1998: Morinaga Milk Industry Eskimo pino
2010: Guthy-Renker Japan Proactiv
2011: Capcom Monster Hunter Portable 3rd
2012: Suntory C.C. Lemon
Hotto Motto
2013: Roast Cuts Donburi
2013: Chicken Nanban
2013: Yakiniku Bibimbap
2013: an
2015: Osaka Metropolis OMP Tower
Nintendo Wii U Mario Kart 8
2015: King Paradise Bay
2015: Toyo Suisan Men-zukuri
2017: Morinaga & Company Ottotto

Stage
1997: Kyo to Kyo
1997: Mask
1998: Kyo to Kyo
1999: Tobe! Tobe! Onna-tachi
2001: Tōmei Ningen no Jōki
2002: Fortin Brass
2003: Jarinkochie
2008: Mitei "Ichi"
2009: If or...
2010: If or... II
2011: If or... III
2012: If or... IV
2013: If or... V
2014: If or... VI
2015: If or... VII
2016: If or... VIII
2017: If or... IX

Solo concerts
2006: 2006 Winter Special Shingo Murakami Solo Live

Discography

Solo songs

CD included tracks
Forward
One's shadow
Dear...
Ai Love You
Ōsama Clinic by Takatsu-King
Ottotto

CD unrecorded songs
In "Job Search Database" of JASRAC's official website, based on the search result of the music including only "Shingo Murakami" as the artist name.
Jinsei don Tsumari
Moshimo Guitar ga Hajiketanara
Babun

References

External links
 – Kanjani Eight's official website by Teichiku Entertainment 
 – Storm family, Kanjani EIght's independent label official website 

Kanjani Eight members
Japanese male actors
Musicians from Osaka Prefecture
1982 births
Living people
People from Takatsuki, Osaka